is a former Japanese football player and manager.

Playing career
Kuramata was born in Saitama Prefecture on December 1, 1958. After graduating from Nippon Sport Science University, he joined Nippon Kokan (later NKK) in 1981. He played until 1992.

Coaching career
After retirement, Kuramata became an assistant coach for NKK in 1993. Because the club was disbanded end of season, he moved to Tokyo Gas (later FC Tokyo). He coached top team as assistant coach and youth team as manager until 2012. He also managed top team in 2006 as Alexandre Gallo successor.

Managerial statistics

References

External links

1958 births
Living people
Nippon Sport Science University alumni
Association football people from Saitama Prefecture
Japanese footballers
Japan Soccer League players
NKK SC players
Japanese football managers
J1 League managers
FC Tokyo managers
Association football defenders